This is the list of all SK Brann's European matches.

Results

Summary

By competition
End of 2019/20

Source: UEFA.com, Last updated on 20 July 2017Pld = Matches played; W = Matches won; D = Matches drawn; L = Matches lost; GF = Goals for; GA = Goals against; GD = Goal Difference. Defunct competitions indicated in italics.

By ground

Last updated: 29 June 2022

UEFA club coefficient ranking

Current
As of 26.06.2017, Source:

Rankings since 2006

Source:

2008–2017

References

Europe
Norwegian football clubs in international competitions